Charles Trevor Edmunds (7 December 1903 – 1975) was a Welsh professional footballer who played as an inside right.

Career
Born in Merthyr Tydfil, Edmunds played for Aberdare & Aberaman Athletic, Bradford City, Chesterfield and Yeovil & Petters United.

For Bradford City he made 19 appearances in the Football League, scoring 11 goals; he also made 2 appearances in the FA Cup.

For Chesterfield he made 8 appearances in the Football League, scoring 1 goal.

Sources

References

1903 births
Welsh footballers
Aberdare Athletic F.C. players
Bradford City A.F.C. players
Chesterfield F.C. players
Yeovil Town F.C. players
English Football League players
Association football inside forwards
1975 deaths